The women's handball tournament at the 2019 African Games was held from 20 to 29 August at the Mohammed V Sports Complex and Sports Center Ibrahim Zahare in Casablanca.

Group stage
All times are local (UTC+1).

Group A

Group B

Knockout stage

Bracket

5–8th place bracket

Quarterfinals

5–8th place semifinals

Semifinals

Ninth place game

Seventh place game

Fifth place game

Third place game

Final

Final standing

References

Women
African Games